Collateral ligament can refer to:
 Lateral collateral ligament (disambiguation):
 Fibular collateral ligament
 Lateral collateral ligament of ankle joint
 Radial collateral ligament of elbow joint
 Medial collateral ligament
 Collateral ligaments of interphalangeal articulations of foot
 Collateral ligaments of metatarsophalangeal articulations
 Ulnar collateral ligament of elbow joint
 Collateral ligaments of metacarpophalangeal articulations